Rose Freymuth-Frazier (born 1977) is an American figurative painter.

Biography
Rose Freymuth-Frazier was born 1977, in Nevada City, California. Lives and paints in New York City.

Painting
Rose Freymuth-Frazier is known for her rigorously rendered portraits of the contemporary female experience as well as paintings of disposable objects such as breast-pumps, balloons and expensive shoes. Her work has received attention from publications including Art Papers, ARTnews, The Chicago Tribune, Direct Art Magazine and American Art Collector Magazine. Freymuth-Frazier studied with and was assistant to Steven Assael in New York City and Odd Nerdrum in Norway. She also attended the Art Students League of New York where she studied with Gregg Kreutz. In 2010 she participated in the John and Diane Marek Visiting Artists Lecture Series at the University of Tennessee at Chattanooga. She is represented by Ann Nathan Gallery in Chicago.

Freymuth-Frazier's work was included in the third annual The Cat Art Show in 2018. In 2022, Freymuth-Frazier held a solo exhibit, "Inner Spaces," at Stone Sparrow NYC.

References

External links

Living people
1977 births
American women painters
People from Nevada City, California
Painters from California
Art Students League of New York alumni
Painters from New York City
21st-century American women artists
Students of Odd Nerdrum